Josef Göppel (16 August 1950 – 13 April 2022) was a German politician. Born in Herrieden, Bavaria, he represented the CSU. He served as a member of the Bundestag from the state of Bavaria from 2002 till 2017.

References

External links 

1950 births
2022 deaths
Members of the Bundestag for Bavaria
Members of the Bundestag 2013–2017
Members of the Bundestag 2009–2013
Members of the Bundestag 2005–2009
Members of the Bundestag 2002–2005
People from Ansbach (district)
Members of the Bundestag for the Christian Social Union in Bavaria
Officers Crosses of the Order of Merit of the Federal Republic of Germany